The Nayak are a Hindu caste; also spelled Nayaka some Nayak are Punjabi found in India and Pakistan. Mainly Nayak follows Hindu. According  to Shah, the Nayaka/ Nayak are of Bhil caste. Besides, they have migrated from various places in Gujarat. Most people prefer to identify themselves as groups from Champaner-Pavagadh.in Rajasthan Nayaks claim that historicaly Bhil

Demographics and occupation
The Nayaks reside in Haryana, Punjab, Rajasthan and West Bengal. They also live in Khammam district and West Godavari district in Andhra Pradesh 

Nayakas live in the Nilgiri Hills in south India, at 11° N and 75° E, on the western jungle slopes, from 1,000 to 300 meters above sea level.

in a number of villages near Ahmedabad in Gujarat. According to Kathryn Hansen, the main occupation of Gujarati Nayaks had been "singing, dancing and acting in plays".

Present circumstances
The Nayak caste is classified as a Scheduled Caste and It is also mentioned  in the Schedule Tribe list.in  Rajasthan,Uttar Pradesh,Gujarat,Maharashtra,Tamil Naduand other states of India.

Related groups
 Nayak dynasty
 Nayakas of Keladi
 Naikda

References

Indian castes
Social groups of Andhra Pradesh
Social groups of Gujarat
Social groups of Haryana
Scheduled Castes of Rajasthan